Mr. Keen, Tracer of Lost Persons was one of radio's longest running shows, airing October 12, 1937 to April 19, 1955, continuing well into the television era. It was produced by Frank and Anne Hummert, who based it upon Robert W. Chambers' 1906 novel The Tracer of Lost Persons. The sponsors included Whitehall Pharmacal (as in Anacin, Kolynos Toothpaste, BiSoDol antacid mints, Hill's cold tablets and Heet liniment), Dentyne, Aerowax, RCA Victor and Chesterfield cigarettes. It aired on the NBC Blue network until 1947, when it switched to CBS.

Characters and story
Bennett Kilpack began as Mr. Keen in 1937 with Arthur Hughes and then Phil Clarke stepping into the role later in the series. The kindly Keen and his faithful assistant, Mike Clancy (Jim Kelly), entertained listeners for 18 years. With 1690 nationwide broadcasts, Mr. Keen was the most resilient private detective in a namesake role. The nearest competitors were Nick Carter, Master Detective (726 broadcasts), The Adventures of Sherlock Holmes (657) and The Adventures of the Falcon (473). Only 59 of the 1690 Mr. Keen programs are known to survive.

Richard Leonard directed scripts by Barbara Bates, Stedman Coles, Frank Hummert, Lawrence Klee and Bob Shaw. James Fleming and Larry Elliott were the announcers. Al Rickey's band provided the background music, including the program's theme, "Someday I'll Find You."

Satires
The cliches, stereotypes and simplistic dialogue provided much fodder for Bob and Ray's parody, Mr. Trace, Keener Than Most Persons, broadcast in numerous variations. It was also combined with rival detective show Martin Kane, Private Eye and satirized by Harvey Kurtzman and Jack Davis in Mad magazine's fifth issue (June–July 1953), as Kane Keen! Private Eye.

The character of Mr. Keen was referenced by Alfred Hitchcock in one of his television shows, according to The Alfred Hitchcock Presents Companion by Patrik Wikstrom and Martin Grams, Jr. Mr. Keen is also mentioned in the stage version of Bye Bye Birdie by the character Mr. Harry MacAfee, who was played by Paul Lynde.

In the "Honeymooners" sketch, "Razor Blades", appearing on the October 12, 1951 episode of Cavalcade of Stars,  Ralph Kramden cannot find his razor blades.  When he questions Alice Kramden about it, she responds, "What am I? Mrs. Keen, Tracer of Lost Razor Blades?".

References

Listen to
 Archive.org: Mr. Keen, Tracer of Lost Persons (all extant episodes)

External links
 Jerry Haendiges Vintage Radio Logs: Mr. Keen, Tracer of Lost Persons
 Original novel (1906) – "Tracer of Lost Persons" cover and excerpts
 "The Wife Who Ran Away," a short story based on Mr. Keen, Tracer of Lost Persons, Radio and Television Mirror January 1941, beginning on page 6

1937 radio programme debuts
1955 radio programme endings
1930s American radio programs
1940s American radio programs
1950s American radio programs
American radio dramas
NBC Blue Network radio programs
CBS Radio programs
NBC radio programs
Detective radio shows
Radio programmes based on novels